Vigilantes of Love is an American rock band fronted by Bill Mallonee, with many secondary players drawn from the musician pool in and around Athens, Georgia, United States.  In its later manifestations in the later 1990s and early 2000s, Mallonee usually sang, played lead and rhythm guitar and harmonica, although in earlier bands he played drums.

The band takes its name from the New Order song "Love Vigilantes," although their sound tends more to folk, Americana, and country rock than new wave.  Their 2001 album Summershine also showed some movement toward Britpop and R.E.M.-style college rock, which would be more fully explored in Mallonee's solo career.

History

The band formed in 1990 in Athens, Georgia, where Bill Mallonee attended the University of Georgia. The act developed as a mostly acoustic, side-project of The Cone Ponies, the last in a long series of line-ups beginning in the mid-1980s with Windows and Walls, and Bed of Roses.  For their first two recording projects—Jugular and Drivin' the Nails—the band performed as a trio between Mallonee, Mark Hall (accordion), and Jonathan "Dog-Mess Jonny" Evans (harmonica). The Athens, Georgia, performance venues in which they were booked regularly included The Flying Buffalo, the 40-Watt Club, Rockfish Palace, Uptown Lounge, and their musical "home"—The Downstairs Restaurant (now DT's Down Under).  For the third and subsequent albums, guitarist and multi-instrumentalist Billy Holmes played an increasingly important role. Later, when greater local success led increasingly to engagements more widely in the Southeast, and with the departure of Mark Hall and Dog-Mess Jonny, the band then re-formed as a traditional touring four-piece rock band including front man Mallonee, Newton Carter, David LaBruyere (later became bass player for John Mayer), and Travis McNabb (later of Better Than Ezra and Sugarland).

The band was signed to Capricorn Records following their third album, Killing Floor. Mallonee has stated that Capricorn's lack of investment in a music video to support Vigilantes made it difficult for them to break out in the broader marketplace.

With Mallonee serving as Vigilantes of Love's frontman, the band's "Double Cure" was nominated for a 1997 Dove Award in the Alternative/Modern Rock Recorded Song of the Year category. The band experienced controversy in the CCM market for the song "Love Cocoon." The song, which described marital sex, led to the band's album Slow Dark Train being dropped by some Christian bookstores.

After many years of successful touring nationally and abroad — the UK and the Netherlands being particularly fond of Mallonnee's music.  The band disbanded in 2001 as Mallonee went solo as a singer-songwriter/guitarist/raconteur playing to the renewed interest in roots-music Americana.

The band reformed in November 2008. The band played its first show back together on November 20 at the 40 Watt Club. That version of the band only lasted a short time before it broke up, and Mallonee returned to his solo career.

Band members
Besides Bill Mallonee, other band members have included at various times:
Chris Bland:  bass
Jacob Bradley:  guitars, bass
Newton Carter:  guitars
Tom Crea:  drums
Chris Donohue:  guitars, bass
Jonny "Dog-Mess" Evans:  harmonica
Bob Goin: bass
Mark Hall:  accordion
Kevin Heuer:  drums
Billy Holmes:  guitars, mandolin, keyboards, bass
Kenny Hutson:  guitars, mandolin, pedal steel guitar, Dobro
John Keane: guitars, pedal steel
Scott Klopfenstein:  drums
David LaBruyere:  bass
Travis McNabb:  drums
Drew Grow: guitars
Doug Nissley: mandolin
John Mallory: guitar, bass, vocals, songwriting

Discography
Jugular (Fingerprint Records, 1990)
Driving the Nails (Core, 1991)
Killing Floor (Fingerprint Records/Sky, 1992) Produced by Mark Heard and Peter Buck
Welcome to Struggleville (Capricorn, 1994)
Strong Hand of Love, tribute to Mark Heard, 1994
Blister Soul (Capricorn, 1995)
My Year in Review (1995, fan club cassette)
V.O.L. (Warner/Resound, 1996, compilation)
Orphans of God, tribute to Mark Heard, 1996
Slow Dark Train (Capricorn, 1997)
Compass (EP) (January 1, 1997)
To The Roof Of The Sky (Meat Market, 1998)
Live At The 40 Watt (Paste, 1998)
Free For Good (A Startled Chameleon, 1998, Europe-only release)
Audible Sigh (True Tunes, 1999, pre-release)
Cross the Big Pond (EP) (1999, Free For Good + extra track)
Audible Sigh (Compass, 2000, wide release)
Audible Sigh w/ Room Despair EP (Compass, 2000, limited release)
Electromeo (EP) (2000, limited release)
Summershine (Compass, 2001)
Resplendent (Audibly Live) (2002)
Live at the Acoustic Cafe (Fundamental, 2007)
Slow Dark Demos: Archive Series Vol. 1
Live at Eddie's (March 1, 2009)
Manicphaseshifter (Live @Schuba's, Chicago, IL) (April 16, 2015)
Need to Bleed (Expanded Edition) (January 31, 2018)

Video
 Fade to Black: Live at the Axiom Arts Centre, Cheltenham, UK 1999 (2004?)

See also
 Bill Mallonee (including solo Discography)
 Buddy Miller – producer, Audible Sigh (1999)
Music of Athens, Georgia

References

External links
 Bill Mallonee official website
 VOL-Sounds Entire catalog on digital download
 Archives of VOL/Bill Mallonee's music and history

Rock music groups from Georgia (U.S. state)
Musical groups from Athens, Georgia
Capricorn Records artists